The commune of Gitega is a commune of Gitega Province in central Burundi. The capital lies at Gitega.
In 2007, DGHER electrified one rural village in the commune.

References

Communes of Burundi
Gitega Province
Gitega